Oxford United F.C. season 2009–10 was the 61st season since Oxford United Football Club turned professional and their 4th season in the Conference Premier. It was their 116th year in existence as a football club and their 110th season of competitive football. In the previous season Oxford United finished seventh in the Conference Premier, four points and two places outside the play-offs after being docked five points for fielding an unregistered player. This article covers the period from 1 July 2009 to 30 June 2010.

During the pre-season, Alfie Potter was brought in on a season-long loan, Rhys Day was signed on a free transfer, and Andy Melville returned as first-team coach. The club also received a large cash windfall of at least £668,000 following the transfer of former player Dean Whitehead from Sunderland to Stoke City. United spent twenty games at the top of the table following seventeen victories from their first twenty-four games. However, only nine wins from the remaining games saw the team fall back into the play-off places, eventually finishing third. A 3–1 aggregate victory over Rushden & Diamonds in the play-offs saw United return to Wembley for the first time in 24 years to face York City. Goals from Matt Green, James Constable and Potter earned United a 3–1 victory that saw them return to the Football League.

Once again James Constable was the club's top goalscorer in all competitions, scoring 24 times, 22 of those coming in the league, one in the FA Cup and one in the play-off final. Thirty-three players represented Oxford throughout the season, with five different nationalities represented. The attendance of 11,963 against Rushden & Diamonds in the play-off semi-final second leg was the highest home attendance of the season, as well as being the second highest ever recorded at the Kassam Stadium.

Review

Pre-season
Oxford announced a number of pre-season fixtures, including a two-game tour to Scotland to face Morton and Rangers. Other pre-season fixtures included games at home to Queens Park Rangers and Peterborough United, a visit to local rivals Oxford City and finally a match against an Aston Villa XI. Joe Burnell was released on 2 July, and was signed by Exeter City eight days later. Alfie Potter was signed on a season-long loan from Peterborough United on 3 July, and ten days later former defender and Welsh international Andy Melville returned to the club as first-team coach. Rhys Day also joined in July, signing on a two-year deal. A welcome windfall to the club was announced on 24 July after the sale of former player Dean Whitehead, from Sunderland to Stoke City. Oxford received 25% of the transfer fee, at least £668,750.

August
Oxford started off the season with a 2–1 home win against York City, the two goals coming in the last three minutes. This was followed by a 1–1 draw away at Kettering Town. Another away game followed, this time a 4–3 victory against Histon. Oxford went top of the league after a 4–0 win against Chester City, followed by a 2–1 home win against Stevenage Borough. Ross Perry and Steven Kinniburgh were signed on loan from Rangers, while Chris Carruthers was loaned out to Crawley Town. A 1–0 win away to AFC Wimbledon, followed by a goalless draw with Forest Green Rovers, kept Oxford unbeaten, and manager Chris Wilder was awarded manager of the month.

September
Jamie Cook was signed on the transfer deadline using a 12th Man scheme where supporters helped to pay the transfer fee. A 2–0 win over Ebbsfleet United maintained Oxford's lead at the top of the Conference. Luton Town were the next visitors to the Kassam Stadium, the game being delayed by fifteen minutes due to crowd congestion. A crowd of over 10,000 saw United win 2–0, despite a missed Constable penalty in the third minute. Youngster Sam Deering was loaned out to Conference South team Newport County for one month to regain full fitness after breaking his leg last year. This was followed up with a 1–0 win at Wrexham. On 16 September, it was announced that the 68 clubs playing in the Conference would each receive a share of £1,000,000 from the Premier League. A 4–0 win against Eastbourne Borough sent United eight points clear at the top of the table, before they fell to their first defeat of the season, away at Mansfield Town. Oxford next travelled to the North East, where they beat Gateshead 1–0 thanks to a Matt Green goal. The U's rounded off September with a 3–1 win over Crawley Town.

October
At the start of the month Chris Wilder was once again awarded manager of the month, with Ryan Clarke awarded player of the month after keeping five clean sheets out of seven games. The lead at the top was reduced to 6 points after a 1–1 draw at Barrow. A behind-the-scenes friendly was played against Watford mid-week to give players without game time a run out, the result being 1–0 to Oxford. The biggest winning margin of the season followed, with a 5–0 thrashing of Grays Athletic. A late equaliser from Simon Clist gave United a 1–1 draw away at York City. The Fourth Qualifying Round of the FA Cup followed, with a 2–0 win over Thurrock. Damian Batt's first goal for the club gave the U's a 1–0 win over Altrincham. Before the FA Cup tie against Yeovil Town, Oxford beat Leicester City 4–0 in a behind-closed-doors friendly, and on the same day Shane Killock and Alex Rhodes left the club.

November
This was followed, at the start of November, by progress into the second round of the FA Cup after taking the League scalp of Yeovil Town 1–0. United then fell to only their second defeat of the season, losing 3–1 at Kidderminster. Oxford bounced back with 1–0 wins at home against Barrow, and away at Forest Green Rovers. Strikers Francis Green and Onome Sodje were brought in on loan to cover for the slight shortages in strikers. Neither loanee featured in Oxford's 1–1 home draw against Barrow in the FA Cup, which meant a replay at Holker Street, the third fixture between the two sides in as many weeks.

December
At half-time on 1 December, United's long stay at the top of the table looked to be coming to an end. United were 1–0 down at Crawley, and Stevenage, just two points behind at the start of play, were winning 1–0. But in an eventful last ten minutes United equalised in the 83rd minute, James Constable had a penalty saved and then made amends with a winning goal in the 4th minute of injury time. Meanwhile, Stevenage had conceded two second-half goals to lose their game, leaving them five points behind United. Oxford maintained this lead, and their winning run, with a comfortable 4–2 home victory over Ebbsfleet, but in their FA Cup replay at Barrow they were comprehensively and uncharacteristically beaten 3–1, denying them a lucrative 3rd-round tie with Premiership side Sunderland. A home victory over Hayes and Yeading in the 1st round of the FA Trophy was scant consolation, though it provided competitive match action for some of United's squad players. Cold weather meant that the away fixture against Cambridge United and the home game on Boxing Day against Rushden & Diamonds were postponed, the latter somewhat controversially and with a large crowd expected. Wilder's first year in charge had ended with a remarkable record of 33 wins from 46 league games. In their final match of the year, and their first league game for more than three weeks, United drew 1–1 away at Salisbury City to finish the year two points clear at the top of the table with games in hand over their nearest rivals.

January
This was a frustrating month for Oxford United. Heavy snow and freezing temperatures meant that several of their games were postponed. Oxford played just one league game between 5 December and 16 January, the 1–1 draw with Salisbury. They ultimately lost top spot in the league, though gaining games in hand. Oxford's first game of 2010 was also their first home loss of the season, against Tamworth. Despite beating Grays Athletic in their second and last league game of January, Oxford failed to regain first position, due to Stevenage's results.
They made progress in the FA Trophy, however, beating Woking at home and Chelmsford City away to reach the fourth round. Oxford also progressed to the semi-finals of the Oxfordshire Senior Cup by beating Kidlington.

February
A goalless draw at home to Kidderminster was enough to see United back to the top of the table on goal difference. After 90 minutes Oxford led 1–0 in the crunch fixture at Luton, but two goals in injury time, the second direct from a corner kick, saw the home team gain an important victory. As before this season, Oxford followed a rare defeat with a run of good results, in this case home wins against Histon, Rushden & Diamonds and AFC Wimbledon, which saw them reopen some breathing space at the top of the table. During that league run United were, however, knocked out of the FA Trophy by Kidderminster.

March
United's fortunes dipped dramatically in March, though there had already been signs in 2010 that their dominance of the league was waning. A draw away at Cambridge was followed by a shock home defeat to part-time Hayes and Yeading (both Hayes goals scored by former Oxford striker Steve Basham), then further lacklustre draws with Kettering, Tamworth and Rushden & Diamonds. A 2–1 home victory over Gateshead on 27th was United's first win in March and boosted the supporters' hopes for the upcoming "six-pointer" against in-form Stevenage. These hopes were dashed when Stevenage won by a penalty, leaving United 8 points behind the new leaders. United's poor form was compounded by impressively consistent results from their nearest rivals: United's return from the month was a mere 7 points from a potential 21, whereas Stevenage earned a maximum 21 from 21 and Luton 22 from 24. Luton also benefited from the confirmed expulsion of Chester City from the league on 8 March; having drawn home and away with Chester earlier in the season they dropped just 2 points, whereas Oxford lost 3 points, and Stevenage 6.

April
United lost again to Hayes & Yeading in the away fixture. The part-timers (beaten 8–0 by Luton in their previous fixture) thus completed an unlikely league double over the former league leaders. This was the first time United had lost consecutive league games all season. They secured a much-needed home win over Salisbury with a late Alfie Potter goal on 5 April, and were boosted by AFC Wimbledon's failure to beat York City on 7th, which meant United were mathematically certain of a play-off place, though their chance of automatic promotion as champions looked to be gone as the end of the season loomed. With the pressure eased, United's form improved as the month progressed; after the Salisbury match they won three of their next four fixtures (beating Altrincham away and Mansfield and Wrexham at home, and drawing at Cambridge). An experimental eleven lost 1–0 to Eastbourne, ending a run of 5 matches without conceding, on the last day of the regular season. United thus finished in third place in the table, behind Luton and promoted Stevenage, and due to play fourth-placed Rushden and Diamonds in the play-off semi-finals.

Play-offs
United took the lead through James Constable in the first leg of their play-off semi-final away to Rushden & Diamonds, before the home side equalised; the game finished 1–1. In the second leg at the Kassam Stadium, second-half goals from Constable and Matt Green confirmed Oxford's place in the Wembley final. In the other semi-final, fifth-placed York City beat league runners-up Luton Town 1–0 in both legs.

Over 33,000 Oxford supporters travelled to Wembley to see Oxford take on York on 16 May. United were two up after 21 minutes, through Green and Constable, before an own goal by goalkeeper Ryan Clarke shortly before half-time made it 2–1. United sealed a 3–1 victory through a breakaway goal in stoppage time, scored by Alfie Potter. Tens of thousands of fans turned up for an open-top bus parade through Oxford two days later.

Team kit
This season's team kit supplier was the American brand Nike, via JustSport, this season being the first in a three-year deal.
The club's main sponsor was Buildbase, a UK-based building company in their 9th year of sponsorship.

Match fixtures & results

Legend
Oxford United results are given first

Friendlies

Conference Premier

Oxford United's home games are played at the Kassam Stadium.

Results summary

Chester City F.C. were expelled from the league on 26 February 2010. Oxford, by this time, had already played Chester once. This match, which Oxford won 4–0 at home, was expunged from the records on 8 March 2010.

Results by round

*Chester City F.C. were expelled from the league on 26 February 2010 and their results were expunged from the record on 8 March. Oxford, by this time, had already played Chester once. The match result and details remain here, though they did not count towards Oxford's final league position

Play-offs
The first leg of the play-offs took place on 29 April, when Oxford took on Rushden & Diamonds at Nene Park and drew 1–1. Oxford played Rushden at home on 3 May and won 2–0. This meant that Oxford went through to the play-off final against York on 16 May, when they won 3–1. As a result, Oxford were promoted back to the Football League for the first time since 2006.

League table

FA Cup

The draw for the fourth qualifying round took place on 12 October, pitting Oxford United against promotion chasing Thurrock from the Conference South. A 2–0 win put United through to the First Round Proper, where they beat Yeovil Town 1–0. Oxford were eliminated in the second round replay by Barrow, thus missing out on the chance to play Sunderland in the third round.

FA Trophy

The draw for the first round took place on 23 November 2009 and the first round took place on 12 December. Oxford progressed by beating Hayes & Yeading United 1–0. The second round was expected to take place on 9 January, but was postponed twice due to bad weather, the match eventually being played on 19 January. Oxford advanced by beating Woking 1–0. In the third round they beat Chelmsford City 3–1 and faced Kidderminster at home in the fourth round, a game which Oxford lost 2–1.

Conference League Cup
Due to sponsor Setanta's GB division entering bankruptcy the Conference League Cup was not contested during the 2009–10 season.

Oxfordshire Senior Cup
The quarter-final took place on 27 January. Oxford drew Kidlington F.C. away and won 2–3 after extra time. They subsequently faced Oxford City in the semi-final and won 2–1, progressing to the final which they won 3–1.

Player details
As of 24 April 2010. (Does not include Oxfordshire County Cup matches or friendlies)

Starting 11

Most used team of 2009–10 Football Conference season.

Transfers

In

Out

Loans in

Loans out

See also
2009–10 in English football
2009–10 Football Conference

References
General
Oxford United F.C. Official Website

Specific

External links
 Oxford United F.C. Official Website
 Oxford Mail

Oxford United
Oxford United F.C. seasons